Freebridge Lynn Rural District was a rural district in Norfolk, England from 1894 to 1974.

It was formed under the Local Government Act 1894 based on the Freebridge Lynn rural sanitary district, and was named after the Freebridge Lynn hundred.  It covered an area to the east of King's Lynn.

It was reduced somewhat in 1935 when under a County Review Order, the civil parishes of Gaywood and North Lynn became part of the borough of King's Lynn.

In 1974, the district was abolished under the Local Government Act 1972, and became part of the West Norfolk district.

Parishes

References

Districts of England created by the Local Government Act 1894
Districts of England abolished by the Local Government Act 1972
Historical districts of Norfolk
Rural districts of England